Valergues is a commune in the Hérault department in the Occitanie region in southern France. Valergues-Lansargues station has rail connections to Narbonne, Montpellier and Avignon.

Population

See also
Communes of the Hérault department

References

Communes of Hérault